Samuel Norton Gerson (November 30, 1895 – September 30, 1972) was a Ukrainian-born American wrestler. He was born in Tymky, Poltava Oblast, Russian Empire, and died in Philadelphia, Pennsylvania.

Career

He competed in the 1920 Summer Olympics, for the United States.  He won the Olympic silver medal in the freestyle wrestling featherweight class after losing the final to Charles Ackerly.  Gerson also graduated from the University of Pennsylvania in 1920.

One of the organizers of Philadelphia's Maccabi Sports Club, Gerson was inducted into the Philadelphia Jewish Sports Hall of Fame in the class of 2006. Dr. George Eisen of Nazareth College included Rybak on his list of Jewish Olympic Medalists. Gerson contended that discrimination against him because of his Jewish background cost him the gold medal, based on what he said he had been told by a competition official at the games. A determined supporter of the Olympics as a means of fostering peace between nations, Gerson's death from a heart attack on September 30, 1972, was said to have been precipitated by the Munich Massacre of 11 members of the Israeli Olympic team at the 1972 Summer Olympics by members of the Black September organization.

See also
List of select Jewish wrestlers

References

External links
Olympic Profile

1895 births
1972 deaths
People from Poltava Oblast
Wrestlers at the 1920 Summer Olympics
American male sport wrestlers
Ukrainian Jews
Jews from the Russian Empire
Emigrants from the Russian Empire to the United States
American people of Ukrainian-Jewish descent
Olympic silver medalists for the United States in wrestling
Medalists at the 1920 Summer Olympics